Mauregard is a French miniseries by Claude de Givray (1970) with Richard Leduc, Claude Jade, Henri Guisol, Brigitte Auber and Michel Subor.

The family epic extends over 120 years from 1849 to 1969: Four generations in Mauregard Castle.

It all starts with the return of the presumed dead nobleman Hippolyte de Mettray (Jacques Berthier) to his wife Anne-Marie (Gaby Sylvia). Who is engaged to the Country Doctor Martin (John Rico). But the repentant adventurer Hippolyte wins Anne-Marie back. At the same time he bought the castle of his ancestors, Mauregard, back.

Twenty years later, Hippolyte wants his son Maxence (Richard Leduc) with Hélène (Annick Korrigan), the rich daughter of the adjacent Marquis, marry. But Maxence, in love with the orphan Françoise (Claude Jade), refuses the money marriage which is mainly obtained Mauregard. Françoise and Maxence are supported in their fight calculated by Hélène.

Another twenty years later - Hippolyte died without leaving a will - can Maxence (now: Henri Guisol) and Françoise (now: Brigitte Auber) hardly get the lock.

Another generation later versa Maxences nephew Charles-Auguste (Michel Subor) from the First World War back. Two women - Agnès (Anne Vernon) and Elise (Marie-Blanche Vergnes) - scramble for him.

Clément (Marc di Napoli), son of Charles-Auguste and Elise, fighting in World War II for the Resistance against the Germans.

In the last part Clément (now: Jacques Destoop) returns with the young Carol (Jacky Gee) from Canada back to the castle Mauregard.

Background

Claude de Givray and Bernard Revon, the authors of the saga, also were François Truffaut's co-authors in Stolen Kisses (1968) and Bed and Board (1970). The leading lady of both films, Claude Jade, played at that time for six months in the USA in Alfred Hitchcock's Topaz. In rotating free time she took the role of orphan Françoise at their familiar "film family". Her Topaz -husband Michel Subor also returned in the meantime returned to France and played the part Charles-Auguste. The film was shot in the Touraine.

Cast

Henri Guisol : Maxence elder
Richard Leduc : Maxence young
Claude Jade : Françoise young
Brigitte Auber : Françoise elder
Jacques Berthier : Hippolyte de Mettray
Gaby Sylvia: Anne-Marie de Mettray
Roger Pigaut : Richard
Christine Simon : Léontine young
Jandeline: Léontine elder
John Rico : Martin
Jacques Couturier : Lefosset
Françoise Morhange : Mme Eugène 
Anne-Marie Coffinet : Aline
Anne Korrigan : Hélène
Michel Subor : Charles-Auguste 
Marie-Blanche Vergne: Élise
Anne Vernon : Agnès
Marc di Napoli : Clément, Charles-Auguste's son
Jacques Destoop: Clément elder
Jackie Gee: Carol
Louis Jojot : Father Louis
René Lafleur : Badin
Jacques Galland : The Mayor
Deniz Direz: Charles-Auguste child
Béatrice Romand : Sophie child
Michèle Montel: Sophie adult
Caroline Reverdiau: Caroline
  Philippe Girard : Philippe

References 

1970 French television series debuts
1970 French television series endings
1970s French television series
2020s French drama television series
Historical television series
French-language television shows
Epic television series
Family saga television series
Television series about dysfunctional families
Television shows filmed in France